Esino is a rural locality (a village) in Ivanovskoye Rural Settlement, Kovrovsky District, Vladimir Oblast, Russia. The population was 15 as of 2010.

Geography 
Esino is located 37 km south of Kovrov (the district's administrative centre) by road. Ivanovo is the nearest rural locality.

References 

Rural localities in Kovrovsky District